The following is a list of commanders of the Liberation Tigers of Tamil Eelam (LTTE), also known as the Tamil Tigers, a separatist militant Tamil nationalist organisation, which operated in northern and eastern Sri Lanka from the late 1970s to May 2009, until it was defeated by the Sri Lankan Military.

See also
Black July
Liberation Tigers of Tamil Eelam
1987 Suicide of Tamil Tigers
Long Range Reconnaissance Patrol (Sri Lanka)
List of Sri Lankan Civil War battles

References

Liberation Tigers of Tamil Eelam members
Sri Lankan Tamil people
Sri Lankan rebels